Shellpot Creek is a tributary of the Delaware River in northeast New Castle County, Delaware. Prior to 1938, the stream drained into the Brandywine Creek, but was subsequently redirected to the Delaware River.

The watershed has a drainage area of nearly 15 square miles, and is the most suburbanized drainage area in the state-designated "Piedmont Basin" (which consists of the watersheds of the Christina River, Brandywine Creek, Red Clay Creek, White Clay Creek, Naamans Creek, and Shellpot Creek). New Castle County, the Calpine Edge Moor Power Plant, the former Chemours Edge Moor plant, Amtrak, and the City of Wilmington all discharge storm-water into Shellpot Creek. During Tropical Storm Allison (1989), the creek flooded to record levels, with the flow rising from 1,300 gallons per minute to 3.6 millions of gallons per minute (or more than 8,000 cubic feet per second).

The name is likely derived from the Swedish Sköllpadde Fallet (meaning "Turtle Falls"), and has been historically known as "Schillpades", "Skilpot", and "Shilpot".

See also
List of rivers of Delaware
Shellpot Park

References

Rivers of Delaware
Tributaries of the Delaware River
Rivers of New Castle County, Delaware